Chloé Paquet was the defending champion, but lost to Ysaline Bonaventure in the second round.

Petra Marčinko won the title, defeating Bonaventure in the final, 6–3, 7–6(7–2).

Seeds

Draw

Finals

Top half

Bottom half

References

External Links
Main Draw

Internationaux Féminins de la Vienne - Singles